Pileanthus is a genus of flowering plants in the family Myrtaceae, endemic to Western Australia. Collectively referred to by the common name coppercups, the eight currently recognised species are:

Pileanthus aurantiacus	 	  	
Pileanthus bellus
Pileanthus filifolius Meisn. Summer coppercups
Pileanthus limacis Labill. Coastal coppercups
Pileanthus peduncularis Endl. Coppercups
Pileanthus rubronitidus	 	  	
Pileanthus septentrionalis
Pileanthus vernicosus F.Muell.

References 

 
Endemic flora of Western Australia
Myrtaceae genera
Myrtales of Australia
Rosids of Western Australia
Taxa named by Jacques Labillardière